The 2011 Formula BMW Talent Cup was the first Formula BMW Talent Cup season. The series champion will receive a fully paid entry to the 2012 German Formula Three Championship.

Drivers

Race calendar
 The five-round calendar for the 2011 season was announced on 29 December 2010. The Oschersleben round was later converted to a single-race "Grand Final" on the support package of the DTM.

References

External links 
 BMW-Motorsport.com

Formula BMW seasons
Formula BMW Talent Cup season
2011 in German motorsport
Formula BMW Talent Cup
BMW Talent Cup